Hawkeye is a city in Fayette County, Iowa, United States. The population was 438 at the time of the 2020 census.

Geography
Hawkeye is located at  (42.938020, -91.951029).

Demographics

2010 census
As of the census of 2010, there were 449 people, 201 households, and 123 families residing in the city. The racial makeup of the city was 99.1% White, 0.7% African American, and 0.2% Native American. Hispanic or Latino of any race were 0.2% of the population.

There were 201 households, of which 25.4% had children under the age of 18 living with them, 47.3% were married couples living together, 10.0% had a female householder with no husband present, 4.0% had a male householder with no wife present, and 38.8% were non-families. 36.3% of all households were made up of individuals, and 19.9% had someone living alone who was 65 years of age or older. The average household size was 2.23 and the average family size was 2.89.

The median age in the city was 43.8 years. 20.7% of residents were under the age of 18; 10.1% were between the ages of 18 and 24; 20.9% were from 25 to 44; 27.6% were from 45 to 64; and 20.7% were 65 years of age or older. The gender makeup of the city was 50.6% male and 49.4% female.

The median income for a household in the city was $30,333, and the median income for a family was $38,438. Males had a median income of $25,781 versus $20,781 for females. The per capita income for the city was $14,319. About 6.0% of families and 8.6% of the population were below the poverty line, including 7.7% of those under age 18 and 15.2% of those age 65 or over.

Education
Hawkeye is a part of the North Fayette Valley Community School District. It was previously a part of the North Fayette Community School District, which merged into the North Fayette Valley district on July 1, 2018.

Economy

Windfarm
Located primarily between Hawkeye and Richfield, a 36 megawatt (MW) windfarm was constructed in 2012. Central Iowa Power Cooperative is purchasing the power generated by the project under a long-term power purchase agreement and is distributing the power to its member cooperatives.
The Hawkeye wind project hosted a ribbon cutting ceremony on October 8, 2012. The keynote speaker and guest of honor was Senator Chuck Grassley. See Video of Chuck Grassley

References

Cities in Iowa
Cities in Fayette County, Iowa